The Tower and the Hive is a 1999 science fiction novel by American writer Anne McCaffrey, the concluding volume of a five-book series also referred to as "The Tower and Hive" series.

Premise 
Human Talents allied with the Mrdini, an alien race who have been under attack by the insectoid Hive species for 200 years, discover a solution to curtail Hivers' explosive population expansions without having to wipe out the species as a whole - a solution which both Alliance species object to.

At the same time a similar solution is discovered to help the Mrdini curtail their own birthrate, now that they no longer have to sacrifice huge numbers of soldiers in battle to save their worlds from Hiver attacks.

The book was published (U.S.) on May 1, 1999, by Ace/Berkley.

"The Tower and the Hive" series 
Beginning with The Rowan, the series follows the lives and careers of the Gwyn-Raven-Lyon dynasty of Talents in the distant future:

1) The Rowan
2) Damia
3) Damia's Children
4) Lyon's Pride
5) The Tower and the Hive

See also the novels To Ride Pegasus, Pegasus in Flight and Pegasus in Space which deal with the early development of the Talents.

Reception 
Kirkus Reviews concluded its review: "Cuddly family/romance/alien-contact saga with useful ideas but far too many characters distinguishable only by their silly names. Still, fans of the series will plunge right in."

Publishers Weekly on the other hand concluded: "The novel lacks the profound imagination of alien minds that's a hallmark of much recent SF, but it also avoids the kill-the-bugs outlook of such SF as Starship Troopers. Readers looking for intelligent, heroic adventure will find it here, and Rowan fans will be especially pleased at this felicitous closing of a popular SF series."

References

External links
 

1999 American novels
1999 science fiction novels
Novels by Anne McCaffrey
To Ride Pegasus
Fictional telepaths
Ace Books books